X Factor is a Danish television music competition to find new singing talent. The first season premiered on 4 January 2008 and ended on 28 March on DR1. Lise Rønne was the host, while Thomas Blachman, Lina Rafn and Remee were the judges.

Judges and hosts
Lise Rønne was the host Thomas Blachman Lina Rafn & Remee were the judges

Selection process

Auditions
Auditions took place in Copenhagen and Århus in 2007.

Bootcamp

Remee was given the 15-24s category, Thomas Blachman was given the Over 25s and Lina Rafn was given the Groups.

Contestants

Key:
 – Winner
 – Runner-up

Results summary

Colour key:
{|
|-
| –  Contestant was in the bottom two and had to sing again in the final showdown
|-
| – Contestant received the fewest public votes and was immediately eliminated (no final showdown)
|-
| – Contestant was saved by the public
|-
|}

Contestants' colour key:
{|
|-
| – Remee's contestants (15-24s)
|-
| – Blachman's contestants (Over 25s)
|-
| – Rafn's contestants (Groups)
|}

Live show details
Colour key:
{|
|-
| –  Contestant was in the bottom two and had to sing again in the final showdown
|-
| – Contestant was eliminated
|-
| – Contestant was saved by the public
|-
|}

Week 1 (8 February)
Theme: Hits from Tjeklisten

Judges' votes to eliminate
 Blachman: Søren & Anne
 Rafn: Lisa Birkevist
 Remee: Søren & Anne

Week 2 (15 February)
Theme: Filmhits

Judges' votes to eliminate
 Blachman: RaiDen
 Rafn: Frederik Konradsen
 Remee: Frederik Konradsen

Week 3 (22 February)
Theme: Disco

Judges' votes to eliminate
 Blachman: Vocaloca
 Remee: RaiDen
 Rafn: RaiDen

Week 4 (29 February)
Theme: Sing Danish

Judges' votes to eliminate
 Blachman: VocaLoca
 Rafn: Lisa Birkevist
 Remee: Lisa Birkevist

Week 5 (7 March)
Theme: BigBand

Judges' votes to eliminate
 Remee: VocaLoca
 Rafn: Basim Moujahid
 Blachman: VocaLoca

Week 6 (14 March)
Theme: Anne Linnet and Elvis Presley
 Musical Guest: Shayne Ward ("No U Hang Up")

Basim Moujahid received the fewest public votes and was automatically eliminated

Week 7 Semi-Final (21 March)
Theme: James Blunt and Free Choice
 Musical Guest: James Blunt ("Carry You Home")

Heidi Herløw received the fewest public votes and was automatically eliminated

Week 8: Final (28 March) 
 Theme: Viewers Choice; Free Choice; winner's single

References

Season 01
2008 Danish television seasons